The Suleiman horse was a type of horse based in the Nugaal Valley and owned by the Dhulbahante tribe according to some traditions.

Description
The Suleiman horse has been described as powerful and courageous:

The Hiin Faniin was a gift given by the poet Mad Mullah to the boqor of the Majeerteen Sultanate. The Mad Mullah also wrote a poem detailing his love for Hiin Faniin.

References

Horses in culture